Elections to Burnley Borough Council in Lancashire, England were held on 7 May 2015, as part of the wider 2015 United Kingdom local elections.

Due to the 'in thirds' format of elections in Burnley, these elections are for those electoral district wards fought in the 2011 Burnley Borough Council election, with changes in vote share compared directly with that year. These seats were contested again in 2019.

As Jonathan Barker (elected in 2012) resigned before the election, two seats were open in the Hapton with Park Ward.

State of the Parties
After the election, the composition of the Council was as follows:

Results

Ward results

References

2015 English local elections
May 2015 events in the United Kingdom
2015
2010s in Lancashire